Mirage is a 2014 Hungarian-Slovak drama film directed by Szabolcs Hajdu. It was screened in the Contemporary World Cinema section at the 2014 Toronto International Film Festival.

Cast
 Isaach De Bankolé as Francis
 Răzvan Vasilescu as Cisco
 Orsolya Török-Illyés as Anna
 Dragos Bucur as Kokas
 Tamás Polgár as Attila

References

External links
 

2014 films
2014 drama films
Hungarian drama films
Slovak drama films
2010s Hungarian-language films
Films directed by Szabolcs Hajdu